Small Country (French: Petit pays) is a novel set in Burundi by the Franco-Rwandan rapper, songwriter and novelist, Gaël Faye. It was first published in France in August 2016 by Grasset, and has since been translated into 36 languages.

Summary 
Set in Burundi and Rwanda from 1993 onwards, the novel is narrated by ten-year-old Gaby, who lives with his French father and Rwandan mother in an impasse in a comfortable district of Bujumbura. Gabriel's sheltered upbringing leaves him oblivious to the increasing tensions between the Hutu majority and the Tutsi minority (to which he, through his mother, belongs). As neighbouring Rwanda faces the outbreak of civil war and genocide, which spill over into Burundi, the innocence of Gaby and his group of friends is brutally shattered.

The novel is based on Gaël Faye's own experiences growing up in Burundi during this period; the author has, however, stressed that it is not strictly autobiographical.

Reception 
The novel was very well-received upon its publication in France, selling 700,000 copies. It was shortlisted for the Prix Goncourt in 2016, as well as for awards by Fémina, Médicis, Interallié, the Académie française and Renaudot. In the same year, it won the prix Goncourt des lycéens, chosen by lycée students (roughly equivalent to high-school age).

An English translation, Small Country, was produced by Sarah Ardizzone and published in 2018. It also received favourable reviews in translation, and was longlisted for the 2019 Aspen Words Literary Prize and the 2019 Andrew Carnegie Medals for Excellence in Fiction and Non-Fiction. In April 2019 it was shortlisted for the 2019 Albertine Prize. Writing in The Guardian, Anthony Cummins called the work "a sharp shock of a novel"; he also, however, expressed disappointment at certain elements of Faye's use of characters, noting that "Faye seems to squander the dramatic potential that a child's point of view might bring."

The novel has also been translated into Italian, Serbian, Portuguese and into the official language of Burundi, Kirundi.

References 

Pages with unreviewed translations
2016 French novels
Novels set in Rwanda
Éditions Grasset books